Splicing factor, arginine/serine-rich 6 is a protein that in humans is encoded by the SFRS6 gene.

Function 

The protein encoded by this gene is involved in mRNA splicing and may play a role in site selection in alternative splicing. The encoded nuclear protein belongs to the splicing factor SR family and has been shown to bind with and modulate another member of the family, SFRS12.

References

Further reading